{
  "type": "FeatureCollection",
  "features": [
    {
      "type": "Feature",
      "properties": {},
      "geometry": {
        "type": "LineString",
        "coordinates": [
          [
            120.97549617290498,
            14.582938659447924
          ],
          [
            120.97549617290498,
            14.582938659447924
          ],
          [
            120.97942292690279,
            14.585212568046678
          ],
          [
            120.97942292690279,
            14.585212568046678
          ],
          [
            120.97987353801729,
            14.585524060546687
          ],
          [
            120.97987353801729,
            14.585524060546687
          ],
          [
            120.98013103008272,
            14.585773254229407
          ],
          [
            120.98013103008272,
            14.585773254229407
          ],
          [
            120.98032414913179,
            14.586115895082667
          ],
          [
            120.98032414913179,
            14.586115895082667
          ],
          [
            120.98051726818086,
            14.586676578965116
          ],
          [
            120.98051726818086,
            14.586676578965116
          ],
          [
            120.98096787929536,
            14.588358622045357
          ],
          [
            120.98096787929536,
            14.588358622045357
          ],
          [
            120.98100006580354,
            14.589033512261157
          ],
          [
            120.98100006580354,
            14.589033512261157
          ],
          [
            120.98086059093477,
            14.589739549041605
          ],
          [
            120.98086059093477,
            14.589739549041605
          ],
          [
            120.98025977611543,
            14.59184726301762
          ],
          [
            120.98025977611543,
            14.59184726301762
          ],
          [
            120.97979843616487,
            14.59245984605262
          ],
          [
            120.97979843616487,
            14.59245984605262
          ],
          [
            120.97884356975557,
            14.593487735788852
          ],
          [
            120.97884356975557,
            14.593487735788852
          ],
          [
            120.97839295864107,
            14.594089931585835
          ],
          [
            120.97839295864107,
            14.594089931585835
          ],
          [
            120.9776955842972,
            14.595221639918051
          ],
          [
            120.9776955842972,
            14.595221639918051
          ]
        ]
      }
    }
  ]
}

Padre Burgos Avenue, also known as Padre Burgos Street, is a 14-lane thoroughfare in Manila, Philippines.

The road was named after Jose Burgos, one of the martyred priests who were executed at the nearby Bagumbayan Field (present-day Rizal Park) in 1872. It is a road in the center of the city providing access to several important thoroughfares like Taft Avenue, Rizal Avenue, Roxas Boulevard, and Quezon Boulevard. The avenue is a component of Circumferential Road 1 (C-1) of Metro Manila's arterial road network and National Route 150 (N150) and National Route 170 (N170) of the Philippine highway network. The Manila City Hall can be accessed using this road, as can the Rizal Park and Intramuros.

Route description
Padre Burgos Avenue starts at the end of Jones Bridge, MacArthur Bridge, and Quezon Bridge, respectively, at the southern bank of the Pasig River near Liwasang Bonifacio. It then merges near Mehan Garden and continues south until it branches to two – Taft Avenue and itself – when it reaches the National Museum of Fine Arts at Rizal Park. It will then turn sharply right, intersecting with Finance Drive, the major thoroughfare of Rizal Park which leads to Ayala Boulevard and Ayala Bridge, therefore the other parts of C-1. Padre Burgos Avenue ends with a junction with Roxas Boulevard, Bonifacio Drive, and Katigbak Drive, its logical continuation towards Quirino Grandstand.

The avenue is a component of National Route 150 (N150), except for its southbound segment between Quezon Bridge and Liwasang Bonifacio Overpass that is a component of National Route 170 (N170). Its segment from its southern end at Roxas Boulevard and Bonifacio Drive, both components of Radial Road 1, to Finance Drive is a component of Circumferential Road 1 (C-1).

History
The origin of Padre Burgos Avenue could be traced back as a street running in parallel along the moat surrounding the walled area of Intramuros, called Paseo de las Aguadas or Calzada de las Aguadas, Calzada de Vidal or Paseo de Sebastián Vidal (apparently named after Spanish botanist Sebastián Vidal y Soler, director of the nearby Botanical Garden of Manila), and Calzada de Bagumbayan or Paseo de Bagumbayan (for being the street that leads to Bagumbayan Field). It was also one of the right-of-way alignments of tranvía that existed until 1945.

Landmarks
Starting from the northern terminus, the road passes the following:

 Manila Central Post Office
 Metropolitan Theater
 Liwasang Bonifacio
 Mehan Garden
 Universidad de Manila
 Bonifacio Shrine
 SM City Manila
 Manila City Hall
 Lagusnilad
 National Museum of Fine Arts
 National Museum of Anthropology
 Rizal Park
 Roundtable
 National Planetarium
 Club Intramuros Golf Course
 Manila Hotel

References

External links
 

Streets in Manila
Ermita